Aspergillus luchuensis (previous names A. foetidus and A. acidus) is a species of fungus in the genus Aspergillus. It belongs to the group of black Aspergilli which are important industrial workhorses. A. luchuensis belongs to the Nigri section. It has been used to produce awamori, a distilled alcoholic beverage made on the Okinawa islands in Japan. The species was first described in Japan in 1901.

Its genome has been sequenced by two different research groups, first in 2016, and then in 2017. The first sequencing of the A. luchuensis genome reported a genome assembly size of 34.7 Mbp and reported the presence of 11,691 genes.

References

luchuensis
Fungi described in 1901